Lee Bailey (born 10 July 1972) is a Scottish professional footballer, who played in the Scottish Football League for Hibernian, Meadowbank Thistle / Livingston, Queen of the South, Brechin City, Stirling Albion and East Fife.

He made one appearance for Hibernian in the Premier Division, but was then released. Bailey then went on to play for Meadowbank and stayed with the club when it relocated to Livingston. He was playing for Brechin City, a part-time club, when they were drawn to play Rangers in the 2000–01 Scottish Cup. Bailey was also working as a driving instructor at that time.

In June 2015, Bailey was appointed assistant manager of Brechin City. At that time, Bailey was also working for the Fife Football Performance Academy.

References

External links

1972 births
Living people
Footballers from Edinburgh
Scottish footballers
Association football forwards
Hibernian F.C. players
Livingston F.C. players
Queen of the South F.C. players
Brechin City F.C. players
Stirling Albion F.C. players
East Fife F.C. players
Bonnyrigg Rose Athletic F.C. players
Scottish Football League players